The Mpumalanga Tourism and Parks Agency (MTPA) Board (formerly Mpumalanga Parks Board) is a governmental organisation responsible for maintaining wilderness areas and public nature reserves in Mpumalanga Province, South Africa.

Parks managed by the MTPA 
 Barberton Nature Reserve
 Blyde River Canyon Nature Reserve, see also Blyde River Canyon
 Loskop Dam Nature Reserve
 Mabusa Nature Reserve
 Mahushe Shongwe Reserve
 Mdala Game Reserve
 Mkhombo Nature Reserve
 Mthethomusha Game Reserve
 Nooitgedacht Dam Nature Reserve
 Ohrigstad Dam Nature Reserve
 Songimvelo Game Reserve
 SS Skosana Nature Reserve
 Verloren Valei Nature Reserve

Private and other parks
 Exeter Private Game Reserve
 Edeni Game Reserve
 Josefsdal Songimvelo Game Reserve
 K'Shani Private Game Reserve
 Mthethomusha Game Reserve
 Sabi Sands Private Game Reserve
 Sabi Sabi Private Game Reserve
 Mala Mala Game Reserve 
 Djuma Game Reserve 
 Lion Sands Reserve 
 Londolozi Private Game Reserve
 Singita Game Reserve 
 Ulusaba Private Game Reserve.
 SterkSpruit Nature Reserve

National Parks and associated reserves in the province

 Greater Kruger National Park
 Associated Private Nature Reserves
 Kruger National Park
The original Kruger National Park, covers the eastern parts of both the Limpopo, and Mpumalanga, provinces of South Africa.

See also 
 South African National Parks
 Protected areas of South Africa

References 

 The MTPA website
 The MTPA Board